The 1984 Tirreno–Adriatico was the 19th edition of the Tirreno–Adriatico cycle race and was held from 8 March to 14 March 1984. The race started in Forio Ischia and finished in San Benedetto del Tronto. The race was won by Tommy Prim of the Bianchi team.

General classification

References

1984
1984 in Italian sport
1984 Super Prestige Pernod